The Princess Theatre is a 677-seat performing arts venue in Decatur, Alabama.  The art deco-style building was originally built in 1887 as a livery stable.  In 1919, the building was transformed into a silent film and vaudeville playhouse.

In 1941 the Princess received its art deco redesign. A bright neon marque which displays the name was installed around the same time.  Local architect Albert Frahn painted the interior in burgundy and gray, with glow-in-the-dark murals.  Outside the doors, the floor is paved with terrazzo in a map of Alabama, that marks the Tennessee River and City of Decatur.

In 1978, the city of Decatur purchased The Princess after it closed as a movie house.  The city gave the theatre a $750,000 renovation, and the stage was again open as the premier performing arts venue for the Decatur area.  The building was listed on the Alabama Register of Landmarks and Heritage in 1981.

The Princess and education

Annually, the Princess hosts 60,000 customers, 20,000 of whom are students and teachers.  Professional performers regularly visit Decatur to perform during school hours for arts education.  The theater also sponsors performers that visit the local Decatur City Schools to teach in the schools.

Future renovation and restoration efforts

The City of Decatur completed renovation in the Sexton Lobby and in the future to restore The Princess to the way it looked during the time period of the 1950s and 1960s.  This includes removing paint that covers the murals painted by Albert Frahn.  Efforts have created a large reception area adjacent and connected to the main theatre.  It includes additional second floor access, concessions, restrooms, dressing rooms, as well as a second entrance to the building was completed in April 2009.

Gallery

References

 The Princess Theatre Center for the Performing Arts (2004–2006)

External links
 Official Princess Theatre website

Buildings and structures in Decatur, Alabama
Theatres in Alabama
Cinemas and movie theaters in Alabama
Theatres completed in 1887
Historic district contributing properties in Alabama
Streamline Moderne architecture in Alabama
National Register of Historic Places in Morgan County, Alabama
Theatres on the National Register of Historic Places in Alabama